Estefanía de los Santos (Seville, 1976) is a Spanish actress who has participated in several national fiction and feature films such as Bienvenidos al Lolita, Perdóname, Señor, El Continental or La peste. In 2012 she was nominated for a Goya Award for her performance in the feature film Grupo 7.

Professional career 
She participated for the first time in a television fiction in 2007, in the Antena 3 comedy for Youtube Chica busca chica. In 2010 she participated in the film Don Mendo Rock ¿La venganza?, but she would achieve greater popularity after starring in the feature film Grupo 7 (2012) by Alberto Rodríguez Librero, a performance for which she was nominated for the Goya Awards as best new actress.

In 2013 she joined the second season of the Antena 3 series Luna, el misterio de Calenda, where she played Marcela. In 2014 she was one of the protagonists of the series Bienvenidos al Lolita. That same year, she participated in the film Carmina y amén.

In 2017 she joined the main cast of the Telecinco series Perdóname, Señor. A year later, she also joined as the main character in Divinity's daily series Yo quisiera. That year she was one of the protagonists of the web series Cúpido of Playz and the series broadcast on TVE El Continental, where she played Gloria. She also starred in the feature film Jaulas by Nicolás Pacheco for which she won the ASECAN award.

In 2019 she starred in Frank Ariza's feature film ¡Ay, mi madre!. She also participated in the Telecinco political series Secretos de Estado and joined the main cast of the Movistar+ series La peste. In 2020 she starred in the film Para toda la muerte  and participated in the Mexican series Herederos por accidente.

In 2021, she participated in the feature film Ama, playing Rosario and starred in Vicente Villanueva's comedy Sevillanas de Brooklyn, where she played Carmen. She also began shooting the film Tras el reflejo, directed by Frank Ariza.

Filmography

Cinema

Television

Awards and nominations

References

External links 
 Estefanía de los Santos on IMDb

Actresses from Andalusia
Spanish film actresses
Spanish television actresses
Living people
1976 births
21st-century Spanish actresses